The 1964 All-Ireland Senior Camogie Championship Final was the 33rd All-Ireland Final and the deciding match of the 1964 All-Ireland Senior Camogie Championship, an inter-county camogie tournament for the top teams in Ireland.

Dublin rushed into a 6-0 to 0-1 lead, and won with ease. Judy Doyle scored 4-1.

References

All-Ireland Senior Camogie Championship Finals
Camogie
All-Ireland Senior Camogie Championship Final
All-Ireland Senior Camogie Championship Final
All-Ireland Senior Camogie Championship Final, 1964
Dublin county camogie team matches